Events in the year 2004 in China.

Incumbents 
 Party General Secretary – Hu Jintao
 President – Hu Jintao
 Premier – Wen Jiabao
 Vice President – Zeng Qinghong
 Vice Premier – Huang Ju
 Congress Chairman – Wu Bangguo
 Conference Chairman – Jia Qinglin

Governors  
 Governor of Anhui Province – Wang Jinshan
 Governor of Fujian Province – Lu Zhangong then Huang Xiaojing 
 Governor of Guangdong Province – Lu Hao
 Governor of Guizhou Province – Huang Huahua
 Governor of Hainan Province – Shi Xiushi
 Governor of Hebei Province – Wei Liucheng
 Governor of Henan Province – Ji Yunshi
 Governor of Hunan Province – Zhou Bohua 
 Governor of Jiangsu Province – Li Chengyu
 Governor of Jiangxi Province – Huang Zhiquan
 Governor of Jilin Province – Hong Hu then Wang Min
 Governor of Liaoning Province – Bo Xilai (until February), Zhang Wenyue (starting February)
 Governor of Qinghai Province – Zhao Leji then Yang Chuantang
 Governor of Shaanxi Province – Jia Zhibang (until October), Chen Deming (starting October)
 Governor of Shandong Province – Han Yuqun
 Governor of Shanxi Province – Liu Zhenhua (until January), Zhang Baoshun (starting January)
 Governor of Sichuan Province – Zhang Zhongwei
 Governor of Yunnan Province: Xu Rongkai
 Governor of Zhejiang Province – Lü Zushan

Events

February
 February 15 – Two fires sweep through China, one in a shopping center and the other in a temple, killing at least 90 and injuring 71.

April
 April 13 – Shanghai modifies its interpretation of the People's Republic of China's One Child Policy, allowing all divorced residents who remarry to have a second child without penalty.

October
 October 21 – In Xinmi, China, a gas explosion in a coal mine kills 62 people; 86 are still missing.

November
 November 1 – Martial law is imposed in parts of China's Henan province after fighting between Hui Chinese and Han Chinese ethnic groups kills between 7 and 148 people.
 November 26 – A man kills eight and injures four people with a knife at a Chinese high school in Ruzhou, Henan.
 November 28 – A coal mine explosion in China kills over 150.

December

Deaths
 February 14 – Yang Chengwu, Chinese military strategist
 March 23 – Chen Zhongwei, Chinese physician. One of the pioneers of the process of reattaching severed limbs.

See also 
 List of Chinese films of 2004
 Chinese Super League 2004
 Hong Kong League Cup 2004–05

References 

 
Years of the 21st century in China